is an interchange passenger railway station located in the city of  Wakayama, Wakayama Prefecture, Japan, operated by the private railway company Nankai Electric Railway.. To distinguish it from Wakayama Station (JR West, Wakayama Railway), the station is called "".

Lines
Wakayamashi Station has the Nankai station number "NK45" and is served by Nankai Electric Railways Nankai Main Line, Kada Line and Wakayamako Line.

Station layout

The station has one ground-level island platform and three bay platforms serving six tracks, and each platform is connected by a footbridge from the ticket gates on the second floor of the station building.

Platforms

Adjacent stations

History
Wakayamashi Station opened on March 21 1903.

Passenger statistics
In fiscal 2019, the JR portion of the station was used by an average of 4,340 passengers daily. During the same period, the Nankai Railway portion of the station was used by 16,455 passengers daily.

Surrounding area
 Wakayama Civic Library
 Wakayama Castle
Wakayama Velodrome
Wakayama City Museum
 Wakayama City Children's Science Museum

See also
List of railway stations in Japan

References

External links

  
 JR West station information 

Railway stations in Japan opened in 1903
Railway stations in Wakayama Prefecture
Wakayama (city)